The Copa Amsterdam (known for sponsorship reasons as the Aegon Copa Amsterdam), formerly known as the Gestion Copa Amsterdam, is an annual youth football tournament, organized and hosted by AFC Ajax for under-19 youth teams which takes place at the Olympic Stadium in Amsterdam. The tournament has been contested by some of the strongest under-19 teams in football, with FC Barcelona, Chelsea and Cruzeiro amongst the participating clubs. The tournament is named after its main sponsor, the insurance company AEGON and was formerly named after the publishing company Gestion, and is broadcast online in over 59 countries via Eredivisie Live, Eurosport and Fox Sports.

History
Established in 2005 as part of the annual Amsterdam Sport Weekend, a citywide sponsored initiative to promote 'sports and recreation' within the city of Amsterdam, the Copa Amsterdam is an international football youth tournament held in the historic Olympic Stadium since 2010. It was originally held at Sportpark Sloten, home of Blauw-Wit Amsterdam from its inception in 2005 up until 2009. Each summer the city of Amsterdam and AFC Ajax invites U-19 teams from various top clubs from around the World to play in the tournament. Seven teams are invited and participate in the competition every year with the ninth edition of the tournament having occurred in 2013. Over the years, clubs such as Barcelona, Juventus, Olympique de Marseille, Real Madrid have had their senior youth teams participate in the tournament.

While hosts Ajax have won the tournament twice (2007, 2011), Cruzeiro from Brazil have won it the most, holding a total of three titles to their name (2006, 2008, 2012). Other teams who have brought home the cup include Panathinaikos (2005), AZ (2009), Chelsea (2010) and Ajax Cape Town (2013). The prizes and awards were handed out by Johan Cruijff in 2009 and 2011, in 2010 it was done by Daley Blind and by Sjaak Swart two years later. Since the 2011 edition, the tournament has been broadcast live on Eredivisie Live on Dutch national television and over the internet with commentary by Leo Driessen, Mark van Rijswijk and Ron de Rijk.

The tournament is attended by prominent local football legends such as Frits Barend, Johan Cruijff and Danny Blind, and is frequented by many talent scouts. In accordance with the theme of the annual Amsterdam Sport Weekend however, an amateur team is put together consisting of local youth players, which is then coached by former Ajax players such as Ronald de Boer did with Men United in the 9th Edition of the tournament. In order to promote sport and recreation in the community, and to give young players an opportunity to present themselves at a high competitive level, coming from Amsterdam and the Region. Other teams that were assembled include the AT5 United, an all-star team composed of local Amsterdam talent, as well as FC NH (North Holland) which was an assembled selection of youth talent from the Dutch province of North Holland as a whole, and not limited to Amsterdam.

Board of Advisors
The Board of Advisors for the tournament consists of seven members, namely John Jaakke, Theo van Duivenbode, Jaap de Groot, René Zegerius, Oege Boonstra, Ronald de Boer and Maarten Oldenhof.

Tournament results

2005 (1st Edition)
(Source)

2006 (2nd Edition)
(Source)

2007 (3rd Edition)
(Source)

2008 (4th Edition)
(Source)

2009 (5th Edition)
(Source)

2010 (6th Edition)
(Source)

2011 (7th Edition)
(Source)

2012 (8th Edition)
(Source)

2013 (9th Edition)
(Source)

2014 (10th Edition)
(Source)

2015 (11th Edition)
(Source)

2016 (12th Edition)
(Source)

2017–2018
For the first time in 12 years the tournament was not held in 2017 due to scheduling issues, with the organizational body making an official statement, that the tournament would presume the following year.

2019 (13th Edition)
The following year the tournament was withheld once more. On April 25th, 2019 Ajax announced that the tournament would finally presume, and will be held on the 29th and 30th of June at the Olympic Stadium. The invited teams include Ajax Cape Town, Sagan Tosu and Sparta Rotterdam.

(Source)

Participation

By country

Titles and awards

Number of titles
(Source)

Official Hall of Fame 
(Source)
The players below are part of the Copa Amsterdam Hall of Fame.

2005
  Milano Koenders (DF)
  Niklas Moisander (DF)
  Rydell Poepon (FW)
  Donovan Slijngard (DF)
  Jeffrén Suárez (FW)
  Kenneth Vermeer (GK)
  Jan Vertonghen (DF)

2006
  Nordin Amrabat (FW)
  Mehmet Güven (MF)
  Özgürcan Özcan (FW)
  Rui Patrício (GK)
  Bruno Pereirinha (MF)
  Jeffrey Sarpong (MF)
  Robert Schilder (MF)

2007
  Vurnon Anita (MF)
  Daley Blind (DF)
  Mitchell Donald (MF)
  Jan-Arie van der Heijden (MF)
  Siem de Jong (MF)

2007 (continued)
  Javier Martina (FW)
  Gregory van der Wiel (DF)

2008
  Toby Alderweireld (DF)
  Christian Eriksen (MF)
  John Goossens (MF)
  Florian Jozefzoon (FW)
  Moestafa El Kabir (FW)
  Marvin Zeegelaar (MF)

2009
  Lorenzo Ebecilio (FW)

2011
  Marco Bizot (GK)
  Tom Boere (MF)
  Ouasim Bouy (MF)
  Lorenzo Burnet (DF)
  Hyago (FW)
  Davy Klaassen (MF)
  Jody Lukoki (FW)
  Lesley de Sa (FW)

2011 (continued)
  Élber Silva (MF)
  Vitinho (MF)

See also 
 Amsterdam Tournament
 Future Cup

References

External links 
 Copa Amsterdam  Official website 
 Biggest social media event at Olympic Stadium (Amsterdam)

AFC Ajax
Football in Amsterdam
Dutch football friendly trophies
Recurring sporting events established in 2005
2005 establishments in the Netherlands
Youth football competitions